In physics, particularly special relativity, light-cone coordinates, introduced by Paul Dirac and also known as Dirac coordinates,  are a special coordinate system where two coordinate axes combine both space and time, while all the others are spatial.

Motivation
A spacetime plane may be associated with the plane of split-complex numbers which is acted upon by elements of the unit hyperbola to effect Lorentz boosts. This number plane has axes corresponding to time and space. An alternative basis is the diagonal basis which corresponds to light-cone coordinates.

Light-cone coordinates in special relativity 
In a light-cone coordinate system, two of the coordinates are null vectors and all the other coordinates are spatial.

Assume we are working with a (d,1) Lorentzian signature.

Instead of the standard coordinate system (using Einstein notation)
,
with  we have
 

Both  and  can act as "time" coordinates.

One nice thing about light cone coordinates is that the causal structure is partially included into the coordinate system itself.

A rotation in the -plane only affects .

Light cone coordinates can also be generalized to curved spacetime in general relativity. Sometimes calculations simplify using light cone coordinates. See Newman–Penrose formalism.
Light cone coordinates are sometimes used to describe relativistic collisions, especially if the relative velocity is very close to the speed of light. They are also used in the light cone gauge of string theory.

Light-cone coordinates in string theory 
A closed string is a generalization of a particle. Time is appropriately described by a parameter . Associating each point on the string in a D-dimensional spacetime with coordinates  and transverse coordinates , these coordinates play the role of fields in a  dimensional field theory. Clearly, for such a theory more is required.

so that the metric  is given by

(summation over  understood).
There is some gauge freedom. First, we can set  and treat this degree of freedom as the time variable. A reparameterization invariance under  can be imposed with a constraint  which we obtain from the metric, i.e.

Thus  is not an independent degree of freedom anymore. Now  can be identified as the corresponding Noether charge. Consider .

Equating this to

where  is the Noether charge, we obtain:

This result agrees with a result cited in the literature.

Free particle motion in light-cone coordinates 
For a free particle of mass  the action is

The canonical momenta are

The Hamiltonian is :

and the nonrelativistic Hamilton equations imply:

One can now extend this to a free string.

See also 
 Newman–Penrose formalism

References 

Theory of relativity